Franck Azéma (born 7 April 1971) is a French rugby union and is the Head coach of Top 14 side Toulon.  He played as a centre.

References

External links
Clermont profile

1971 births
Living people
Sportspeople from Haute-Savoie
Rugby union centres
USA Perpignan players
Montpellier Hérault Rugby players
ASM Clermont Auvergne players
French rugby union players